Food Policy is a bimonthly peer-reviewed scientific journal covering food policy. It was established in 1975 and is published bimonthly by Elsevier. The editors-in-chief are Mario Mazzocchi (University of Bologna) and Christopher B. Barrett (Cornell University). According to the Journal Citation Reports, the journal has a 2018 impact factor of 3.788.

References

External links

Publications established in 1975
Elsevier academic journals
Bimonthly journals
Policy analysis journals
Food science journals
English-language journals